Pressurization or pressurisation is the application of pressure in a given situation or environment.

Industrial 
Industrial equipment is often maintained at pressures above or below atmospheric.

Atmospheric 
This is the process by which atmospheric pressure is maintained in an isolated or semi-isolated atmospheric environment (for instance, in an aircraft, or whilst scuba diving).

See also
 Cabin pressurization
 Compressed air
 Decompression (diving)
 Decompression (physics)
 Gas compressor
 :Category:Units of pressure
 Pressurisation ductwork

Pressure

it:Pressurizzazione (aeronautica)